Mahmoud Abed Atta (born 1954) is/was an American and alleged militant from the Palestine Liberation Organization who was suspected to be responsible for bombing a bus in 1986, on the  West Bank, killing one and severely injuring three.

Biography
A naturalized US citizen, Mahmoud Atta arrived at Simon Bolivar Airport, Venezuela's main international airport in June 1987. He was coming from Mexico, and was monitored by the DISIP Venezuelan Counterintelligence Service. Mahmoud Atta was responsible for Abu Nidal clandestine terrorist operations in Central and South America countries. From the airport, Atta took a taxi to the city of Valencia, State of Carabobo, Venezuela, where he had high level Abu Nidal officials contacts.

After 7 days of surveillance and monitoring his calls, the apartment was raided by the DISIP commandos unit, and Atta was arrested, and transferred to Caracas, Venezuela. With all the information collected by the surveillance, Atta was interrogated by the Venezuelan DISIP Counterintelligence Department. 
Venezuelan Counterintelligence officials found a false bottom in his suitcase, finding 2 false US passports, and a lot of letters hand written by Atta. Addresses, telephone numbers, names, and countries of the Abu Nidal Terrorist Organization were found in the false bottom of his suitcase.  Atta was deported by the government of Venezuela to the U.S. and arrested by the FBI. 
After that, Atta was extradited to Israel in 1990, tried and sentenced to life in prison.

Disappearance
Following the September 11 attacks in the United States it was initially thought that Mahmoud Mahmoud Atta was one of the hijackers on board the first plane to hit the World Trade Center. This led to the harsh questioning of US immigration authorities and the intelligence community, because it was felt that they had failed to stop a known terrorist from entering the country under his true name. However, his identity was confused with the Egyptian militant leader Mohamed Atta who was actually on board the flight.

Mahmoud Mahmoud Atta's current whereabouts are unknown.

See also
List of fugitives from justice who disappeared

References

1954 births
Fugitives
People deported from Venezuela
People extradited from the United States
People extradited to Israel
People with acquired American citizenship
Possibly living people